Narayan Lucky is an Indian actor, who has worked in the Tamil film industry. He debuted as the lead role in the campus film Inidhu Inidhu (2010), before portraying supporting roles.

Career
Narayan's elder brother was selected to portray Madhavan's friend in Mani Ratnam's romantic drama, Alaipayuthey (2000). Seeing his brother as an actor, prompted Narayan to pursue acting opportunities. After completing his MBA, Narayan joined as the marketing head of INOX multiplex for Chennai operations and his interactions with film people got him noticed
and he was eventually shortlisted for the lead role in Prakash Raj's production Inidhu Inidhu (2010). He quit his job to seek a full-time career in films, but the film did not perform well commercially, though his character of Tyson was well received by critics. He subsequently chose to find work again and became more selective with roles, notably playing a drug addict in Radha Mohan's bilingual, Payanam (2011).

He won critical acclaim for a cameo comedy role in Rajesh's Oru Kal Oru Kannadi (2012), as a potential suitor to Hansika's character, in a role originally written for actor Jiiva. He gained recognition for playing one of the leads in Thiranthidu Seese (2015).

He participated in Survivor (Tamil Season 1). He was eliminated from the show in Day 89.

Filmography

Films

Television

References

Living people
Male actors in Tamil cinema
Indian male film actors
21st-century Indian male actors
Place of birth missing (living people)
Year of birth missing (living people)
Male actors in Telugu cinema